The Fereshteh Pasargad Hotel  is a mixed-use complex currently under construction in the Elahieh neighbourhood of Tehran, Iran, designed by the late architect Zaha Hadid. After completion, it will be the tallest building in Tehran and Iran. 

It will consist of parking on 9 floors, commercial and office spaces with conference halls and crafts stores on 7 floors, 3 floors for mechanical and electrical uses, amusement centres and restaurants on 4 floors, 1 floor for a lobby and 30 floors of five-star hotel accommodation. 

The construction of the project has started in 2011 and it is estimated for completion in 2024.

References

Hotels in Tehran
Hotels in Iran
Hotels established in 2021
Hotel buildings completed in 2021
2021 establishments in Iran